Ishaq Zazai (born 27 June 2003) is an Afghan cricketer. He made his first-class debut for Kabul Region in the 2019 Ahmad Shah Abdali 4-day Tournament on 4 April 2019. He made his Twenty20 debut on 9 October 2019, for Speen Ghar Tigers in the 2019 Shpageeza Cricket League.

References

External links
 

2003 births
Living people
Afghan cricketers
Kabul Eagles cricketers
Spin Ghar Tigers cricketers
Place of birth missing (living people)